My Name Is Khan (initialism as MNIK) is a Dhallywood romantic action film directed by Badiul Alam Khokon. The film stars Shakib Khan, Apu Biswas, Prabir Mitra and Misha Sawdagor in the lead roles. It was released on Eid-ul-Fitr, 9 August 2013.

Cast
 Shakib Khan as Sagor Khan
 Apu Biswas as Jhinuk Chowdhury
 Prabir Mitra as Suleman Khan, Grandfather of Sagor Khan
 Subrata as Sajjad Khan, Sagor Khan's father
 Olka Sarker as Sagor Khan's mother, wife of Sajjad Khan
 Rehena Jolly - Herself
 Nuton as Sharmin Jahan Chowdhury, Mother of Jhinuk Chowdhury
 Sadek Bachchu - Jhinuk Chowdhury's Father 
 Misha Sawdagor as Ramiz Raja
 Afzal Sharif
 Elias Kobra
 Puja Cherry Roy as the child artist

Music
The soundtrack of My Name Is Khan was composed by  Ali Akram Shubho. The song "My Name Is Khan" was released as a promotional single on 21 July 2013, the video promo of the song "Jibon Amar" was released on 26 July 2013. and on 30 July 2013, the promo video of "Shokale Tomae Dekhi" was released.

Production
The film was shot in Bangladesh and Thailand.

References

External links
  My Name Is Khan - Official Page
 My Name Is Khan at BMDB

2013 films
2010s romantic action films
2013 romantic comedy-drama films
Bengali-language Bangladeshi films
Bangladeshi romantic comedy-drama films
Bangladeshi romantic action films
2013 masala films
Films shot in Thailand
Films scored by Ali Akram Shuvo
2010s Bengali-language films
2013 comedy films
2013 drama films